Henriette von Pereira-Arnstein  (29 November 1780 – 13 May 1859) was an Austrian pianist and salon-holder.

Life
Henriette von Pereira-Arnstein was born in Berlin in 1780, daughter of the Viennese banker Nathan von Arnstein and his wife Fanny von Arnstein, who maintained an upper-class salon in Vienna frequented by artists, musicians, diplomats and politicians.

Henriette was educated at her parents' home, and she studied the piano with Muzio Clementi and Johann Andreas Streicher. She married in 1802 the banker Heinrich Freiherr von Pereira (1773–1835); they had three sons and a daughter.

After the death of her mother in 1818, she continued her mother's salons, but on a smaller scale and less formally. They took place on Fridays and there were musical performances, including herself as pianist. Her guests included musicians Ludwig van Beethoven, Felix Mendelssohn and Franz Liszt; and poets Franz Grillparzer, Theodor Körner and Clemens Brentano. She had a strong friendship with Theodor Körner, and his song cycle Leier und Schwert ("Lyre and Sword") was written for her.

Like her mother, she was involved in many charities; she was director of the Marienspital in Baden bei Wien. She died in Vienna in 1859.

References

1780 births
1859 deaths
19th-century classical pianists
19th-century Austrian people
Austrian people of German descent
People from Berlin
Austrian salon-holders